A pet monkey is a monkey kept as a pet. The practice of keeping monkeys as pets is controversial.

Monkeys have often been favorite pets of queens such as Catherine de' Medici and Henrietta Maria, wife of Charles I.

Ship's monkeys
When the British first began to explore Africa, young monkeys were often captured and taken back on board the ship to entertain sailors. For example, a Senegal monkey was kept as a pet by a ship's cook in the 19th century and entertained passengers with its antics.  Some were later kept in zoos; many modern captive monkeys in the UK are descended from such Victorian-era monkeys. The same practice is thought to have occurred during the Napoleonic wars; it is rumored that such practices led to a monkey being washed ashore and hanged in Hartlepool, causing the people of Hartlepool to be nicknamed the Monkey Hangers.

As service animals for the disabled
Some organizations train capuchin monkeys as monkey helpers to assist quadriplegics and other people with severe spinal cord injuries or mobility impairments. After being socialized in a human home as infants, the monkeys undergo extensive training before being placed with a quadriplegic. Around the house, the monkeys help out by doing tasks such as microwaving food, washing the quadriplegic's face, and opening drink bottles. For safety and the possibility of learning through operant condition methods using positive punishment, the quadriplegics had the ability to deliver a warning tone or 0.5 second shock to the monkey. As with all primates, monkeys must never be fully trusted with a human life in an environment they find demanding or where their needs are not being attended to. In at least one study, the monkey completed all tasks and punishment was used only in the learning stage.

Popular culture

In popular culture both actual and fictionalized accounts of pet monkeys are utilized extensively. Monkeys are popular in numerous books, television programs, and movies. 
Sun Wukong (the "Monkey King"), a character who figures prominently in Chinese mythology, is the main protagonist in the classic comic Chinese novel Journey to the West. The television series Monkey, the literary characters Monsieur Eek and Curious George are all examples. The winged monkeys are prominent characters in The Wizard of Oz.

However, pop culture often incorrectly labels apes, particularly chimpanzees, gorillas and orangutans as monkeys. Terry Pratchett makes use of the distinction in his Discworld novels, in which the Librarian of the Unseen University is an orangutan who gets very violent if referred to as a monkey.

Famous pet monkeys
There have been many famous pet monkeys with Tarzan's Cheeta arguably the first famous pet "monkey" although they continued to live in the jungle. Nkima was the original Cheeta-like character in Edgar Rice Burroughs' Tarzan novels, and in adaptations of the saga to other media, particularly comics. Tarzan and Cheeta have been repeated across all major popular culture mediums including books, films, television, games and comics. Katie, a white-headed capuchin, played Marcel in the popular U.S. series Friends and also Los Angeles Angels' mascot "Rally Monkey." Finster played Harvey Keitel's pet thief, Dodger in the movie Monkey Trouble. Bubbles was a companion to Michael Jackson and became intertwined in his celebrity and was even a subject of a Jeff Koons sculpture. Frankie the Monkey has been seen in Sean-Paul and Juliane's magic act all over the country.

Curious George
Curious George is the protagonist of a popular children's books  franchise by the same name, written by Hans Augusto Rey and Margret Rey. The books feature a curious pet monkey named George, who is brought from his home in Africa by "The Man with The Yellow Hat" to live with him in a big city. Around the world, the adventures of Curious George have been translated in many languages. The character has spawned books in many languages, two television series, two stop-motion animated shorts, an animated film, Curious George, featuring Will Ferrell, a video game and he has been linked with numerous products and companies.

List of fictional pet monkeys
Literature
 Ampersand is the name of Yorick Brown's pet monkey in the comic book series, Y: The Last Man.
 Chee-Chee is the pet companion of Doctor Dolittle, created by Hugh Lofting.
 In A Little Princess, the heroine finds and returns Carrisford's pet monkey
Cartoons 
 Abu is the pet in Disney's Aladdin
 Beppo was Superman's pet monkey.
 Bippy, a small monkey that accompanies Timmy Turner in the first Fairly Oddparents movie Abra-Catastrophe 
 Boots is the pet explorer in Dora the Explorer
 Chim-Chim is the pet monkey of Speed Racer and his family
 Mojo was Homer Simpson's helper monkey who eventually adopts Homer's unhealthy lifestyle and becomes very obese
 Mr. Teeny on The Simpsons, is Krusty the Clown's assistant
 Mr. Twitchy from Rated A for Awesome was the pet of a group of four 12-year-old kids who are the main protagonists of the series
 So-So is the pet sidekick of Peter Potamus, from Hanna-Barbera.
 Tenshin is Meirin Kanzaki's pet monkey in Ask Dr. Rin!

Film 
 Dodger is the trained pickpocket monkey from Monkey Trouble (1994)
 Bonzo is the chimpanzee that Ronald Reagan takes care of in Bedtime for Bonzo (1951)
 Mona is the pet from Robinson Crusoe on Mars
 Spike is Ace Ventura's monkey companion in Ace Ventura: Pet Detective (1994) and Ace Ventura: When Nature Calls (1995).
Monkey is Dante's pet monkey in Grandma's Boy
 Jack the Monkey is  Captain Barbossa's pet capuchin monkey named after Jack Sparrow in the Pirates of the Caribbean franchise.
 Caesar is Will Rodman's chimpanzee in Rise of the Planet of the Apes (2011)
 The couple that John Cusack and Cameron Diaz's characters form in Being John Malkovich (1999) have a pet monkey.
 Norma Desmond owns a chimpanzee prior to the beginning of Sunset Boulevard (1950). The chimpanzee's death, in a roundabout way, prompts Desmond to take on Joe Gillis as a kept man.

Television 
 Debbie the Bloop (named for the unusual sound it made) was the chimpanzee with very long ears from the first season of Lost in Space.
 Klaus was Dieter's touchable monkey on the Saturday Night Live skit "Sprockets"
 Joey and Davey Monkey – on Sesame Street
 Jonny the Monkey is "the most famous celebrity in Kazakhstan" according to Borat in many of his interviews and introduced as Kazakhstan's "most successful actor" by Borat in an opening skit of "Saturday Night Live" in November 2006.
 Marcel was Ross' pet monkey on the TV show Friends.

See also
 Travis

References

online-literature.com
pbs.org
scripsit.com
americanrevolution.org
hawaii.edu

Monkeys
Monkey
Monkey
Domesticated animals